The 1964–65 DDR-Oberliga was the 16th season of the DDR-Oberliga, the first tier of league football in East Germany.

The league was contested by fourteen teams. National People's Army club ASK Vorwärts Berlin won the championship, the club's fourth of six national East German championships all up.

Bernd Bauchspieß of BSG Chemie Leipzig was the league's top scorer with 14 goals, becoming the first player to finish as top scorer on three occasions. For the third time the title East German Footballer of the year was awarded, going to Horst Weigang of SC Leipzig.

On the strength of the 1964–65 title Vorwärts qualified for the 1965–66 European Cup where the club was knocked out by Manchester United in the first round. Seventh-placed club SC Aufbau Magdeburg qualified for the 1965–66 European Cup Winners' Cup as the seasons FDGB-Pokal winner and was knocked out by West Ham United in the quarter finals. Fourth-placed SC Leipzig qualified for the 1965–66 Inter-Cities Fairs Cup where it was knocked out in the second round by Leeds United.

Table									
The 1964–65 season saw two newly promoted clubs, Dynamo Dresden and SC Neubrandenburg.

Results

References

Sources

External links
 Das Deutsche Fussball Archiv  Historic German league tables

1964-65
1
Ober